Everestiomyia is a genus of flies in the family Tachinidae.

Species
 Everestiomyia antennalis Townsend, 1933

References

Tachinidae
Arthropods of Asia